2001: Live in Las Vegas (also known as Live Summer Tour) is a live album by the Monkees recorded during their "Monkeemania Returns Tour" (2001–2002). A companion DVD was released as well. The concert was recorded at the MGM Grand in Las Vegas, Nevada, in March 2001.

Track listing

"Last Train to Clarksville"
 "A Little Bit Me, a Little Bit You"
"Randy Scouse Git"
"Your Auntie Grizelda"
"Valleri"
"Goin' Down"
"Lucille"
"Oliver! Medley: Consider Yourself, I'd Do Anything, Who Will Buy?"
"Since I Fell for You"
"Is You Is or Is You Ain't My Baby?"
"(Your Love Keeps Lifting Me) Higher and Higher"
"Girl"
"Bach: Two Part Intervention in F"
"I'm a Believer"
"Papa's Gene's Blues"
"That Was Then, This Is Now"
"Porpoise Song"/"Listen to the Band"
"Daydream Believer"
"(I'm Not Your) Steppin' Stone"
"Pleasant Valley Sunday"

Personnel
Micky Dolenz: vocals, guitar, drums, tympani
Davy Jones: vocals, guitar, percussion
Peter Tork: vocals, guitars, keyboard, banjo
Jerry Renino: musical director, bass, vocals
Dave Alexander: keyboards, vocals
Wayne Avers: guitars, vocals
Aviva Maloney: saxophones, flute, keyboards, vocals
Sandy Gennaro: drums, percussion
Eric Biondo: trumpet
Sam Albright: saxophone
Gregory Briggler: trombone

References

The Monkees live albums
2001 live albums
Rhino Records live albums
Albums recorded at the MGM Grand Las Vegas